Bradley L. Dee (born May 5, 1950) is an American politician from Utah. He was a Republican member of the Utah State House, representing the state's 11th house district in Ogden from January 2003 through January 2017. He retired from office after choosing not to seek re-election in 2016.

Early life and career
Dee holds a B.A. in public relations from Weber State University and an M.A. in human resources from the University of Phoenix. Dee is a Latter-day Saint. He has previously served as a bishop in the LDS Church. He currently works as human resources director for Weber County, Utah and lives in Washington Terrace, Utah with his wife Marsha and five children.

Political career
Dee was first elected to the Utah House of Representatives in 2002 and began serving on January 1, 2003. He previously served as mayor of Washington Terrace, UT and as a member of its city council.

During the 2016 legislative session, Dee served as the House Vice-chair of the Executive Appropriations Committee, on the House Public Utilities, Energy, and Technology Committee, and the House Transportation Committee.

2016 sponsored legislation

Dee passed six of his nine introduced during the 2016 Legislative Session, giving him a 66.7% passage rate. He also floor sponsored four bills.

Elections
 2014: Dee faced Democrat Amy Steed Morgan in the general election, winning with 4,364 votes (62.6%) to Morgan's 2,607 votes (37.4%).
 2012: Dee faced Democrat Pamela Udy in the general election, winning with 9,266 votes (68.1%) to Udy's 4,332 votes (31.9%).
 2010: Dee faced Democrat Steven Gaskill in the general election, winning with 4,288 votes (69.5%) to Gaskell's 1,883 votes (30.5%).

References

External links
Webform to contact Brad Dee

Republican Party members of the Utah House of Representatives
University of Phoenix alumni
Weber State University alumni
Latter Day Saints from Utah
Living people
1950 births
21st-century American politicians
Politicians from Ogden, Utah
People from Weber County, Utah